Tavagna is a former Corsican piève. Located in northeast Corsica, it belonged to the province of Bastia in political terms and the diocese of Mariana in religious terms.

Geography 
The land of Tavagna corresponded to the territories of the communes of: 	

 Taglio-Isolaccio,
 Talasani,
 Pero-Casevecchie,
 Poggio-Mezzana,
 Velone-Orneto.

Church 
The church, or "piève" of Tavagna was the church of San Ghjuvanni Battista, located in the municipality of Poggio-Mezzana. Today, the church has been completely renovated. According to Geneviève Moracchini-Mazel, there is no longer any way to detect older parts in today's masonry.

References 

Geography of Corsica